Rai Bahadur Sir Sunder Lal  was born in Jaspur, near Nainital, on 21 May 1857.

In 1876, he joined Muir Central College at Allahabad then led by Augustus Harrison. While an under-graduate Pandit Sunder Lal passed the Vakil's Examination of the High Court in 1880 and was enrolled as a Vakil on 21 December 1880. He practiced in Allahabad High Court. In 1896 the High Court raised him to the rank and status of Advocate.

The distinction of 'Rai Bahadur' was conferred on him in 1905. He was appointed a CIE in 1907. In 1909 he accepted a seat on the Bench of the Judicial Commissioner's Court at Lucknow for a few months and in 1914 for brief periods officiated as a Judge of the Allahabad High Court.

Appointed Member, Council of Law Reporting, Allahabad; Member of the Board of the Allahabad Court to represent Vakils, 1893; enrolled as Advocate, 1893; Fellow Allahabad University, since 1888 Member of the Syndicate, 1895, represented University in U.P. Legislative Council, 1904; and 1906–1909; one of the Secretaries of the MacDonnell Boarding House, Allahabad; Offg. Additional Judicial Commissioner, Oudh, 1909; Vice-Chairman, U.P. Exhibition, 1910–11; acting Judicial Commissioner for 5 months; Judge, High Court, N.W.P.. 1914; owner of the largest private library in the Province; prominently connected with the establishment of the University School of Law and the Hindu University, Benares; nominated as an Additional Member, Imperial Legislative Council, 1915: resigned his seat in the U.P. Legislative Council, 1915. Address: Allahabad.

In 1906, he became the first Indian Vice Chancellor of Allahabad University. He was reappointed to that office in 1912 and 1916.

In 1916, he was named the founding Vice Chancellor of Banaras Hindu University (BHU). The Sir Sunderlal Hospital of the Institute of Medical Sciences on the BHU campus is named in his honor.

On 21 February 1917, Sunder Lal received a knighthood. He died in Allahabad on 13 February 1918 at age 61.

References 

1918 deaths
1857 births
Vice Chancellors of Banaras Hindu University
Indian Knights Bachelor
Knights Bachelor
Lawyers awarded knighthoods
Companions of the Order of the Indian Empire
Rai Bahadurs
19th-century Indian lawyers
Scholars from Varanasi
20th-century Indian lawyers